Arizabad (also Romanized as ʿArīzābād; also known as ‘Azīzābād) is a village in Vahdat Rural District, in the Central District of Zarand County, Kerman Province, Iran. At the 2006 census, its population was 263, in 61 families.

References 

Populated places in Zarand County